Henry H. Houston Elementary School is a historic elementary school located in the Mount Airy neighborhood of Philadelphia, Pennsylvania. It is part of the School District of Philadelphia. The building was designed by Irwin T. Catharine and built in 1926–1927. It is a three-story, nine bay, brick building on a raised basement in the Late Gothic Revival-style. It features a projecting stone entryway with Tudor arched opening, stone surrounds, and a crenelated parapet.

The building was added to the National Register of Historic Places in 1989.

References

External links

School buildings on the National Register of Historic Places in Philadelphia
Gothic Revival architecture in Pennsylvania
School buildings completed in 1927
Mount Airy, Philadelphia
School District of Philadelphia
Public K–8 schools in Philadelphia
1927 establishments in Pennsylvania